Bendix Corporation is an American manufacturing and engineering company which, during various times in its existence, made automotive brake shoes and systems, vacuum tubes, aircraft brakes, aeronautical hydraulics and electric power systems, avionics, aircraft and automobile fuel control systems, radios, televisions and computers. It was also well known for the name Bendix, as used on home clothes washing machines, but never actually made these appliances.

History

Early history

Founder and inventor Vincent Bendix initially began his corporation in a hotel room in Chicago in 1914 with an agreement with the struggling bicycle brake manufacturing firm, Eclipse Machine Company of Elmira, New York. Bendix granted permission to his invention which was described as "a New York device for the starting of explosive motors." This company made a low cost triple thread screw which could be used in the manufacture of other drive parts. By using this screw with the Eclipse Machine Company, Bendix had a good foundation for his future business plans.

Automotive
General Motors purchased a 24% interest in Bendix in 1924, not to operate Bendix but to maintain a direct and continuing contact with developments in aviation, as the engineering techniques of the auto and aircraft were quite similar then. In the 1920s, Bendix owned and controlled many important patents for devices applicable to the auto industry. For example, brakes, carburetors, and starting drives for engines. It acquired Bragg-Kliesrath brakes in the late 1920s. In 1942 Ernest R. Breech became president of Bendix, moving from General Motors. After performing brilliantly for Bendix by introducing GM management philosophies, he attracted the attention of Henry Ford II who persuaded Breech to move to Ford where he finished his career. By 1940 Bendix had sales running c. $40 million. In 1948, General Motors sold its interest in Bendix as GM wanted to focus on its expanding automotive operations. Bendix was formally founded in 1924 in South Bend, Indiana, United States. At first it manufactured brake systems for cars and trucks, supplying General Motors and other automobile manufacturers. Bendix manufactured both hydraulic brake systems and a vacuum booster TreadleVac for its production lines for decades. In 1924 Vincent Bendix had acquired the rights to Henri Perrot's patents for Drum brake/drum and shoe design.

In 1956, Bendix introduced Electrojector, a multi-point electronic fuel injection system, which was optional on several 1958 models of automobiles built by Chrysler.

In the 1960s, Bendix automotive brakes blossomed with the introduction of fixed-caliper disc brakes and the "Duo-Servo" system (which became, virtually, a de facto world standard for drum brakes).  During the 1960s, Bendix also dabbled in bicycle hardware, producing a reliable, totally self-contained, 2-speed "Kick-Back" planetary rear axle with coaster braking. Also, just as reliable, was the Bendix "Red Band" and "Red Band II" single speed coaster brake hub. followed by the Bendix "70" and Bendix "80" hub. Considered one of the best hubs on the market, at the time.

When Allied Signal took over Bendix in the 1980s, it quickly divested the brake and steering division to TRW to focus on aerospace applications and railcars. (TRW had already assumed control over Lucas Girling Brake Division years earlier.) The Bendix Electronic Control Unit division was divested to Siemens-VDO; a part of giant Robert Bosch GmbH and formed the foundation of the VW Digifant system and later Bosch Motronic Electronic Control Units introduced in the late 1980s. In the fall of 2018, TRW was assumed by ZF Ind of Germany and the Bendix brake trademark was licensed to Germany's OPTIMAL, where it resides today.

Starting in the 1950s or before, Bendix Pacific designed, tested, and manufactured hydraulic components and systems, primarily for the military. In the same facility, avionics and other electronic hardware was designed, manufactured, and documented in technical manuals. Much of this operation was relocated to a new facility in Sylmar, California where they had a large deep indoor pool for testing sonar. Telemetry components for the RIM-8 Talos surface-to-air missile included transmitters and oscillators in various frequency bands as well as the missile itself were designed and built by Bendix. They built and installed the telemetry system in all the ground stations for the first crewed space flights. For this program, they developed the first cardio tachometer and respiration rate monitor system which enabled a ground-based physician to observe an astronaut's vital signs. MK46 torpedo electronics also came from this facility. Other diverse products included radar detectors in aircraft that identified ground missile tracking and ground missiles launched at aircraft. In the 1960s they produced an anti-lock brake system for military aircraft using established technology similar to Dunlop's earlier Maxaret. The technology is similar to the notched wheel and reluctor now used in cars.

Bendix Scintilla manufactured MIL SPEC electrical connectors of many styles. Criteria were met for hostile and non-hostile environments that provided seals against liquids and gasses.

In 1971, Bendix introduced the world's first true computerized ABS (anti-lock) system on Chrysler's 1971 Imperial. Production continued for several years.  Under its present ownership by Honeywell, Bendix continues to manufacture automotive brakes and industrial brakes for a wide variety of industries. In 2014, Honeywell sold the Bendix trademark for automotive brakes in the US, to MAT Holdings.

Many Bendix automotive, truck and industrial brakes sold in the United States used asbestos as late as 1987.  Bendix's current parent, Honeywell, continues to deal with numerous lawsuits brought as a result of asbestos-containing Bendix brand brakes.

In February 2020, Bendix announced that it would be moving its headquarters from Elyria, Ohio to Avon, with an expected opening date for its new facility of November 2021.

Mass spectrometer

A collaboration between Fred McLafferty and Roland Gohlke and William C. Wiley and Daniel B. Harrington of Bendix Aviation in the 1950s led to the combination of gas chromatography and mass spectrometry, and the development of Gas chromatography–mass spectrometry instrumentation. Beginning in the 1960s, Bendix produced scientific instruments such as the Bendix MA-2 Time-of-Flight Mass Spectrometer.

Radiological Dosimetry

Bendix also manufactured Radiological Dosimeters for Civil Defense during the cold war, they also made a Family Radiation measurement kit for home use, which included a CDV-746 dosimeter and a CDV-736 Rate meter, which looked like a dosimeter.

Dosimeters manufactured by Bendix for the Office of Civil Defense included: CDV-138; CDV-730; CDV-736-Ratemeter; CDV-740; CDV-742, the version most commonly used by Civil Defense; and CDV-746.

The Dosimeters measured in Roentgens an hour, which is the standard measurement for ionising radiation.

'Dashaveyor' Automated Guideway Transit
In the late 1960s Bendix purchased the rights to the Dashaveyor system – developed for mining and goods movements – in order to use it as the basis for an automated guideway transit (AGT) system, during the heyday of urban transport research in the late 1960s. Often referred to as the Bendix-Dashaveyor in this form, the system used the basic design of the cargo system, but with a larger passenger body running on rubber wheels. Bendix ceased marketing the system by 1975 after it failed to attract interest.

Avionics, military and government
In 1929 Vincent Bendix branched out into aeronautics and restructured the company as "Bendix Aviation" to reflect the new product lines.

Bendix Aviation was founded as a holding company for the assets of Delco Aviation Corporation, Eclipse Machine Company, Stromberg Carburetor Company, and other aircraft accessory manufacturers.

Bendix supplied aircraft manufacturers with all types of hydraulic systems, for braking and flap activation, and introduced new devices such as a pressure carburetor which dominated the market during World War II. It also made a wide variety of electrical and electronic instruments for aircraft.

The Bendix Corporation sponsored the famous Bendix continental air race which started in 1931, and is known for the Bendix Trophy. The competition was a transcontinental U.S. point-to-point race meant to encourage the development of durable, efficient aircraft for commercial aviation. Civilians were barred from the race in 1950. The last race took place in 1962.

During World War II Bendix made nearly every ancillary instrument or equipment for military aircraft. The Bendix radio division was established in 1937 to make radio transmitter/receivers for aircraft and other types of avionics. During the war Bendix manufactured about 75% of all avionics in US aircraft. During and after the war Bendix made radar equipment of various types.

Bendix ranked 17th among United States corporations in the value of wartime production contracts.

One product made by Bendix was a Land Mine Detecting set for the United States Army and United States Air Force in July 1952.  The manual numbers for this portable detecting set is US Army manual number TM-5-9540 and US Air Force manual number TO39B-40-5. This set had audio and visual indications and operated on low volt batteries. This backpack style detecting set came with two probes, batteries, detecting plate and other basic electronics in an organized seal fiberglass box. It also manufactured landing gear oleo struts and jet engine fuel controls for early J79 engines and designed guidance systems and assembled the Talos missile for the US Navy. Bendix aviation masks and gauges were modified and tested for use in diving and hyperbaric applications.

In the 1950s, Bendix and its successors managed United States Atomic Energy Commission facilities in Kansas City, Missouri and Albuquerque, New Mexico.  These facilities procured non-nuclear components for nuclear weapons.

In 1956, the computer division of Bendix Aviation introduced the Bendix G-15, a mini computer which was the size of two tall filing cabinets. The company sold about 400 of these at prices starting at below US$50,000. The Bendix computer division was taken over in 1963 by Control Data Corporation, which continued to support the G-15 for a few years.

The chief designer of the G-15 was Harry Huskey, who had worked with Alan Turing on the ACE in the UK and on the SWAC in the 1950s. Huskey created most of the design while working as a professor at Berkeley and other universities, and also as a consultant.

The company was renamed to Bendix Corporation in 1960.

During the 1960s the company made ground and airborne telecommunications systems for NASA. It also built the ST-124-M3 inertial platform used in the Saturn V Instrument Unit which was built by the Navigation and Control Division in Teterboro, NJ. It also developed the first automobile fuel injection system in the US.

In January 1963, the Civil Aeronautics Board (CAB) released a report stating that the "most likely abnormality" to have caused the crash of American Airlines Flight 1 on March 1, 1962 was a short circuit caused by wires in the automatic piloting system that had been damaged in the manufacturing process. CAB inspectors had inspected units at a Teterboro, New Jersey, Bendix Corporation plant and discovered workers using tweezers to bind up bundles of wires, thus damaging them. The Bendix Corporation issued denials, stating that the units underwent 61 inspections during manufacture, in addition to inspections during installation and maintenance work, and insisted that had the insulation on the wires been breached at some point, it would have been detected and the unit replaced.

In 1966 NASA selected Bendix Aerospace Systems Division in Ann Arbor, Michigan to design, manufacture, test, and provide operational support for packages of the Apollo Lunar Surface Experiments Package (ALSEP) to fly on the Apollo Program.

Bendix made the fuel system for the Lockheed SR-71 Blackbird.

Marine

During World War II, Bendix was contracted to make engine order telegraphs for the United States Navy.

Washing machines
Although popularly connected to washing machines, the Bendix Corporation itself never manufactured them. In 1936, the company licensed its name to Bendix Home Appliances, another South Bend company, for a 25% stake in the company.

In 1937, Bendix Home Appliances, Inc was the first company to market a domestic automatic washing machine. Although sales were initially slow, the benefits of an automatic machine soon began to spread by word-of-mouth. Sales started to climb, so that by the time the USA entered World War II, a total of 330,000 units had been sold. In common with other washing machine manufacturers, production ceased during the war, but resumed in 1946. Total sales reached 2,000,000 by 1950.

The 1937 Bendix Home Laundry  would be recognised as a front-loading automatic washer by any modern user of such machines. It had a glass porthole door, a rotating drum and an electrically driven mechanical timer. The machine was able to autofill, wash, rinse and spin-dry. Initially the lack of any vibration damper meant that the machine had to be secured firmly to the floor. The machine also lacked an internal water heater.

Bendix Home Appliances, founded by Judson Sayre, was later sold to Avco Manufacturing Corporation. In 1956, Avco sold Bendix Home Appliances to Philco.

Home electronics

Bendix first manufactured domestic radios and phonographs for the retail market after WWII as an outgrowth of its production of aircraft radios. In 1948 Bendix started to sell car radios directly to Ford and other auto manufacturers. From 1950 to 1959, Bendix made television sets.  Production of radios for the retail trade grew quickly in the 1950s, but stopped quickly in the 1960s when Ford, General Motors and Chrysler started producing their own radios.

Mergers
In the decades between 1970 and 1990, Bendix went through a series of mergers, sales and changes with partners or buyers including Raytheon, Allied Signal and others. This diluted its corporate identity, though for some years these companies used the Bendix brand for some of their products, such as aircraft flight control systems.

In 1982 Bendix launched a hostile takeover bid of the conglomerate, Martin Marietta. Bendix bought the majority of Martin Marietta shares and in effect owned the company. However, Martin Marietta's management used the short time between ownership and control to sell non-core businesses and launch its own hostile takeover of Bendix – the Pac-Man Defense. Industrial conglomerate United Technologies joined the fray, supporting Martin Marietta in their counter-takeover bid. In the end, Bendix was rescued by Allied Corporation, acting as a white knight. Bendix was acquired by Allied in 1983 for US$85 per share. Allied Corporation, later named AlliedSignal, later bought Honeywell and adopted the Honeywell name, and Bendix became a Honeywell brand, including the Bendix/King brand of avionics. Honeywell's Transportation Systems division also carries the Bendix line of brake shoes, pads and other vacuum or hydraulic subsystems.

In 2002 Knorr-Bremse took over the commercial vehicle brake business from Honeywell, USA its share of joint ventures in Europe, Brazil and the USA. Bendix Commercial Vehicle Systems became a subsidiary of Knorr-Bremse. The Knorr-Bremse Group achieved sales of EUR 2.1 billion for the first time.

Advertising
In the 1960s and 1970s, Archie Comics ran comic-strip ads for Bendix brakes for bicycles featuring Archie Andrews and his friends.

See also 
 Bendix drive
 Ernest L. Webster, formed Startomatic Company, which was leased to Bendix
 Mary Cunningham
 William Agee

References

Footnotes

Notes

Bibliography

External links 

 GMnext.com: Bendix Aviation Corporation — on General Motors wiki
 Bendix Aviation Corporation and Your Business! – Michiana Memory Digital Collection
 Bendix Aviation Equipment Service Guide – AirCorps Library
 Bendix Appliances homepage (bad link)
 Popular Mechanics: "Certificate of Brake Test Made Automatically by Small Recorder" (April 1936) – portable brake testing unit developed and sold by Bendix in the 1930s.
 Bendixline (1957–1958, 1962–1964) – Digitized copies of the Bendix Products Division newsletter
 Bendix: First Fifty Years in South Bend – Michiana Memory Digital Collection

 
1914 establishments in Illinois
1983 disestablishments in Indiana
1983 mergers and acquisitions
American companies established in 1914
American companies disestablished in 1983
Asbestos
Auto parts suppliers of the United States
Companies based in St. Joseph County, Indiana
Computer companies established in 1914
Computer companies disestablished in 1983
Defunct computer companies of the United States
Defunct manufacturing companies based in Indiana
Engineering companies of the United States
Electronics companies of the United States
Honeywell
Instrument-making corporations
Manufacturing companies established in 1914
Manufacturing companies disestablished in 1983
South Bend, Indiana
Superfund sites in Michigan
Technology companies established in 1914
Technology companies established in 1983
General Motors